This is a list of World War I Entente aircraft organized by country of origin. Dates are of first flight.



Canada

France

Italy

Japan

Romania

Russia

United Kingdom

United States

References

Citations

Bibliography

See also

Entente aircraft
Entente
Entente Powers in World War I, List of military aircraft of
Entente aircraft